The Radiators may refer to:

 The Radiators (American band), rock band from New Orleans, Louisiana (1978–2011)
 The Radiators (album), their 2001 album
 The Radiators (Australian band), rock band from Sydney, Australia (1978–present)
 The Radiators from Space, Irish punk rock band (1976–1981, 2004–present), also known as The Radiators

See also
Radiator (disambiguation)